'Mohammed Ahmed Al Mahmood' (born 30 December 1950 in Al Ain, UAE) was the extraordinary and authorized Ambassador of the United Arab Emirates to the Federal Republic of Germany  from 2004 until 2012, when he was succeeded by Juma Mubarak Al Junaibi

Biography
Mohammed Ahmed Al Mahmood was born 30 December 1950 in Al Ain, United Arab Emirates. He is married and has 7 children.

Education
In 1975 Mahmood received a diploma in politics, economic and international relations from Oxford University in the United Kingdom. He received a senior leadership diploma from Harvard University (United States) in 2003.

Qualifications
In 1973 Mahmood  entered the Ministry of Foreign Affairs and has occupied several positions. Between 1978–1987 he transferred to the department of protocol and hospitality at the presidential office and was promoted to the rank of assistant undersecretary. Between 1987–1993 he served as extraordinary and authorized ambassador to the Islamic Republic of Pakistan non-resident ambassador to Mauritius. From 1993 to 2001 he served as extraordinary and authorized Ambassador to the Arab Republic of Egypt and permanent delegate at the Arab League (Non-resident Ambassador to Kenya, Nigeria and Ghana). Between 2001-2004  he served as assistant undersecretary for technical affairs in the ministry of foreign affairs. In 2004 he was promoted to the rank of Undersecretary and since 2004 has been acting as extraordinary and authorized ambassador to the Federal Republic of Germany and non-resident ambassador to Latvia, Lithuania, Estonia and Croatia).

Orders
Mahmood received the Order of Merit in the rank of officer from France and the order of the Pakistani star for the Islamic Republic of Pakistan

References

External links 
 Official website of the Embassy of the UAE in Germany 

Ambassadors of the United Arab Emirates to Germany
Ambassadors of the United Arab Emirates to Lithuania
Ambassadors of the United Arab Emirates to Estonia
Ambassadors of the United Arab Emirates to Croatia
Ambassadors of the United Arab Emirates to Latvia
Ambassadors of the United Arab Emirates to Pakistan
1950 births
Living people